Johann von Robais, Baron de Kalb (June 19, 1721 – August 19, 1780), born Johann Kalb, was a Franconian-born French military officer who served as a major general in the Continental Army during the American Revolutionary War. He was mortally wounded while fighting against the British Army during the Battle of Camden.

Early life and education
Kalb was born in Hüttendorf, a German village near Erlangen, Principality of Bayreuth, the son of Johann Leonhard Kalb and Margarethe Seitz. He learned French, English, and the social skills to earn a substantial military commission in the Loewendal German Regiment of the French Army in 1743.

Career
Kalb served with distinction in the War of the Austrian Succession in Flanders. During the Seven Years' War, he was promoted to lieutenant colonel and made assistant quartermaster general in the Army of the Upper Rhine, a division created by the disbanding of the Loewendal Regiment. He was awarded the Order of Military Merit in 1763 and elevated to the nobility with the title of baron.

In 1764, Kalb resigned from the army and married Anna Elizabeth Emilie van Robais, the French heiress to a fortune from cloth manufacturing. He bought the Milon-la-Chapelle chateau near Versailles, where he took up a quiet life of farming. He had three children: Élie, Frederic, and Caroline; Eli later married Elise Signard d'Ouffières and have a daughter, Nicette de Kalb, who married Raymond de Vandière de Vitrac d'Abzac, and continued to live in Milon la Chapelle; Frederic would die during the French Revolution without children.

In 1768, Kalb traveled to North America on a covert mission from the Duc de Choiseul, the Foreign Minister of France, to determine the level of discontent among colonists towards Great Britain, a major French adversary. During his four-month trip, Kalb gained respect for the colonists and their "spirit of independence", producing detailed reports for the French government; upon his return to Europe, he expressed a strong desire to go back to colonial America and join their nascent fight against the British.

American Revolutionary War
In July 1777, Kalb returned to North America with his protégé, the Marquis de Lafayette, and joined the Continental Army. He was disappointed and angry to learn that he would not be made a major general, but with Lafayette's influence was appointed to the rank on September 5, 1777, which he learned of as he was on the road to return to France.

Kalb was at Valley Forge for most of the winter between 1777 and 1778, commanding a division of Patterson's and Learned's Brigades. During this time, he wrote letters of introduction for John Adams to the French court, expressing a poor opinion of French forces:

On the whole, I have annoyances to bear, of which you can hardly form a conception. One of them is the mutual jealousy of almost all the French officers, particularly against those of higher rank than the rest. These people think of nothing but their incessant intrigues and backbitings. They hate each other like the bitterest enemies, and endeavor to injure each other wherever an opportunity offers. I have given up their society, and very seldom see them. La Fayette is the sole exception; I always meet him with the same cordiality and the same pleasure. He is an excellent young man, and we are good friends ... La Fayette is much liked, he is on the best of terms with Washington.

Kalb was assigned to command a division of Maryland and Delaware troops, and he was ordered south to the Carolinas in command of these reinforcements. During the British southern campaign, he was disappointed to learn that Horatio Gates had been appointed to command instead of him. Gates led the army to a disastrous defeat at the Battle of Camden on August 16, 1780. De Kalb's horse was shot from under him, causing him to tumble to the ground. Before he could get up, he was shot three times and bayonetted repeatedly by British soldiers. His friend and aide, the Chevalier du Buysson, was seriously wounded blocking additional blows with his own body.

Upon seeing Kalb, Cornwallis told him, "I am sorry, sir, to see you, not sorry that you are vanquished, but sorry to see you so badly wounded." It is reported that Cornwallis supervised the dressing of Kalb's wounds by his own surgeons in Camden, South Carolina. As he lay dying, Kalb was reported to have said to a British officer, "I thank you sir for your generous sympathy, but I die the death I always prayed for: the death of a soldier fighting for the rights of man." He died three days later and was buried in Camden.

Upon visiting de Kalb's grave several years after his death, George Washington is reported to have said:

Legacy

De Kalb was greatly revered by his contemporaries and is still regarded as a hero of the American Revolution. Numerous towns and counties in the U.S. bear his name, including in Alabama, Georgia, Illinois, Indiana, Mississippi, Missouri, New York, Tennessee and Texas. Streets include DeKalb Avenue in Brooklyn, New York City, and Merrick, New York, DeKalb Pike (U.S. Route 202) between King of Prussia and Montgomeryville, Pennsylvania, and others. 

In Brooklyn, New York, the Knights of Columbus, a Catholic fraternal order, established the Baron DeKalb Council #1073 in 1906. His portrait was painted posthumously by Charles Willson Peale, who was best known for his paintings of leading figures of the American Revolution. In 1886, a monument to  Kalb was erected on the grounds of the Maryland state house to honor his contributions to the American Revolution.

Two warships of the U.S. Navy were named after him: the Civil War river ironclad USS Baron DeKalb and the World War I troop transport USS DeKalb.

An American elementary school run by the U.S. Department of Defense in Nuremberg, Germany was named for him; it closed in the 1990s. Since 2006, the Major General Baron DeKalb Army Reserve Center hosts the headquarters of the 200th Military Police Command at Fort Meade, Maryland.

In Camden, South Carolina, outside the Revolutionary War Visitor Center, is a statue of de Kalb to commemorate his bravery in the Battle of Camden.

Fiction
In Assassin's Creed III, a mission for Connor's apprentices shows that Baron de Kalb was a member of the Templar Order within the Continental Army, making him an asset for supposed Templar domination in the colonies. Here, Connor's apprentices killed de Kalb in order to reduce Templar influence in the army.

Footnotes

References

External links

 

1721 births
1780 deaths
Military personnel from Erlangen
United States military personnel killed in the American Revolutionary War
Continental Army generals
Continental Army officers from Germany
German emigrants to France
German emigrants to the United States
German military personnel of the Seven Years' War
Deaths by bayonet